Dalisa Magdalena Alegría Gómez (born 1983) is a film and telenovela actress, and former television presenter from the Dominican Republic.

Early life, family and education
Born into an affluent family of Rancho Arriba, San José de Ocoa Province, she is the daughter of politician and lottery businessman Pedro Alegría and his wife Eva Gómez. Alegría has 2 brothers and 2 sisters.

Career 
She was Miss San José de Ocoa on Miss Dominican Republic 2003 the year Amelia Vega won Miss Universe.

Alegría was nominated in the Best Supporting Actress category of the Soberano Awards in 2013 for her role in Lotoman 2.0.

In 2014 Alegría was finalist on Luz García’s Cuerpos Hot del Verano annual contest.

Filmography

References

External links 
 

1983 births
Living people
Beauty pageant contestants
Dominican Republic film actresses
Dominican Republic telenovela actresses
Dominican Republic women television presenters
Miss Dominican Republic
People from San José de Ocoa Province
White Dominicans